Isidoro Aquino Díaz (born 4 April 1966) is a former association footballer who played as a central defender for Sportivo Luqueño and the Paraguay national football team.

References

Paraguayan footballers
Sportivo Luqueño players
Paraguay international footballers
Living people
1966 births
Association football defenders
Tigres UANL footballers
Cerro Porteño players